Jozef Pukaj (born 13 February 2000) is a professional footballer who plays as a goalkeeper for Swiss club Winterthur. Born in Switzerland, he plays for the Kosovo national team.

Career
Pukaj is a product of the youth academies of FC Amicitia Riehen and Basel. On 20 January 2021, he joined Stade Lausanne Ouchy on loan for the second half of the 2020-21 season. On 2 June 2021, he transferred to the Swiss Challenge League club Winterthur. He made one appearance in the Challenge League that season, as won the tournament and earned promotion into the Swiss Super League for the 2022-23 season. He made his professional debut with Winterthur in a 1–1 Swiss Super League tie with his childhood club Basel on 16 July 2022.

International career
Born and raised in Switzerland, Pukaj is of Kosovo Albanian origin. From 2015, until 2019, he has been part of Switzerland at youth international level, respectively has been part of the U16, U17, U18, U19 and U20 teams and he with these teams played 20 matches.

On 11 November 2022, Pukaj received a call-up from Kosovo for the friendly matches against Armenia and Faroe Islands. His debut with Kosovo came eight days later in a friendly match against Faroe Islands after being named in the starting line-up.

Honours
Winterthur
 Swiss Challenge League: 2021–22

References

External links
 
 SFL Profile

2000 births
Living people
People from Riehen
Kosovan footballers
Kosovo international footballers
Swiss men's footballers
Switzerland youth international footballers
Swiss people of Kosovan descent
Association football goalkeepers
FC Basel players
FC Stade Lausanne Ouchy players
FC Winterthur players
Swiss Super League players
Swiss Challenge League players